Adi Burjorji Godrej (born 3 April 1942) is an Indian billionaire businessman and industrialist, head of the Godrej family, and chairman of the Godrej Group. , he has a net worth of US$2.3 billion.

Early life
Godrej completed his schooling at St. Xavier's High School and then St. Xavier's College, [[Mumbai
]] for two years. He earned an undergraduate degree from HL college and an MBA from the MIT Sloan School of Management, where he was a member of the Pi Lambda Phi fraternity and a member of Tau Beta Pi.

Career
After his return to India, he joined the family business. He modernised the management structure and implemented process improvements. Adi Godrej took the Godrej Group to great heights during the License Raj. He heads the group alongside his brother, managing director of Godrej Industries and chairman of Godrej Agrovet, Nadir Godrej, and his cousin, Godrej & Boyce managing director and chairman, Jamshyd Godrej.

In 2021 he announced his plans to step down as Chairman of Godrej Industries Ltd, holding company of the Godrej Group. He would still serve as Chairman of the Godrej Group and Chairman-Emeritus of GIL.

Under his stewardship, Godrej Consumer Products has grown into a strong emerging market FMCG player based on a 3X3 approach to international expansion — building a presence in three emerging markets (Asia, Africa, Latin America) across three categories (home care, personal wash, hair care).

Beyond Godrej 
He has been president of several Indian trade and industrial bodies and associations.

He was the chairman of the Indian School of Business from April 2011 to April 2018 and was elected as the president of the Confederation of Indian Industry (CII) for the year 2012–13. He has been a member of the dean's advisory council of the MIT Sloan School of Management, and chairman of the board of governors of the Narsee Monjee Institute of Management Studies.

Twenty-five percent of the shares of the Godrej holding company are held in trusts that include the Pirojsha Godrej Foundation, the Soonabai Pirojsha Godrej Foundation, and the Godrej Memorial Trust. Through these trusts the Group supports healthcare, education, and environmental sustainability initiatives such as The Mangroves, Teach for India, WWF, and the Godrej Memorial Hospital.

Personal life
He was married to socialite and philanthropist Parmeshwar Godrej until her death in October 2016 and has three children. They live in Malabar Hill, South Mumbai.

References

External links 

 Profile at Godrej Group

Businesspeople from Mumbai
Parsi people from Mumbai
Indian billionaires
MIT Sloan School of Management alumni
Living people
1942 births
Recipients of the Padma Bhushan in trade and industry
Godrej Group
Cathedral and John Connon School alumni
20th-century Indian businesspeople
Godrej family